Harting is a civil parish in the Chichester District of West Sussex, England. It comprises the village of South Harting and the hamlets of East Harting, West Harting and Nyewood.

At the 2011 Census, the population was 1,451, an increase from 1,407 at the 2001 Census.

History
Harting was listed in the Domesday Book (1086) under the ancient hundred of Dumpford as the large Manor of Hertinges, which included 196 households encompassing South, West and East Harting.  They were 134 villagers, 42 smallholders and 20 slaves.  With resources including ploughing lands, meadows, woodland and nine mills, it had a value to the lords of the manor of £100. The joint lords were the church of St Nicholas, Arundel, and Earl Roger of Shrewsbury.

Apart from three generations of the Earls Montgomery the manor was in the possession of the Crown until 1610 when it was granted to the Caryll family. In 1746 the manor was purchased by the Featherstonhaugh family, in whose possession it remains.

Harting Down 
The villages are overlooked by Harting Down, a  common owned by the National Trust and part of the Sussex Downs Area of Outstanding Natural Beauty.

Archaeological evidence has suggested that Harting Down was first occupied around 5000 years ago. Neighbouring Beacon Hill is home to a hillfort from the Iron Age, built around 500 BC as an animal enclosure and refuge. In addition, a cross ridge dyke was built around the same time, may have been used to control movement of people and animals along the ridgeway.

Because of its elevation Beacon Hill, just to the east of Harting Down, hosted a station in the shutter telegraph chain, from 1796 to 1816,  which connected the Admiralty in London to its naval ships in Portsmouth and Plymouth. This was replaced in 1822 by a semaphore station which operated on a slightly different route until 1847. Bertrand Russell and his wife Dora founded the experimental Beacon Hill School at Telegraph House, which was their residence in 1927.

West of Beacon Hill is Tower hill, on top of which is the Vandalian Tower, a folly dating to the 18th century which is in the grounds of Uppark house. It was built to celebrate the founding of the American colony of Vandalia in 1774, though the events of the American Revolution meant that the colony never got off the ground. The tower is in ruins and cannot be entered, but can be seen from outside.

A large portion of the down has never been used for modern intensive farming and is thus an important site representing the chalk grassland that once covered the downs. Plants found on the site include quaking grass and the common spotted orchid. The down supports animals such as adders, skylarks and several species of butterfly.

Governance
An electoral ward of the same name covers this parish and the neighbouring parishes of Elsted and Treyford and Trotton with Chithurst. The ward's population at the 2011 Census was 2,026.

See also
Harting Old Club
Torberry Hill

References

External links

Further historical information and sources on GENUKI

Villages in West Sussex
Chichester District
Napoleonic beacons in England